Hawthorn Ridge Cemetery No. 2 is a Commonwealth War Graves Commission burial ground for the dead of World War I situated on the grounds of the Beaumont-Hamel Newfoundland Memorial near the French town of Beaumont-Hamel.

Layout and history
Hawthorn Ridge Cemetery No. 2 is 460 metres south of Hawthorn Ridge Cemetery No. 1. It was created by the V Corps, originally named V Corps Cemetery No. 12 in the spring of 1917. An additional seven isolated graves were brought into the cemetery following the Armistice. There are now over 200 First World War casualties commemorated in this site. Of these, over 50 are unidentified. The great majority of those located in the cemetery  fell on 1 July 1916 during the Battle of the Somme. The cemetery covers an area of 1,019 square metres and it is enclosed by a low stone rubble wall.

External links
 
 
 
 

Canadian military memorials and cemeteries
Commonwealth War Graves Commission cemeteries in France
1917 establishments in France
World War I cemeteries in France
Battle of the Somme
Newfoundland in World War I
Cemeteries in Somme (department)